Monte Toc, nicknamed the walking mountain by locals due to its tendency to experience landslides, is a mountain on the border between Veneto and Friuli-Venezia Giulia in Northern Italy best known for the Vajont Dam, which was built at the mountain's base in 1960. In  Friulian, the mountain's name is the abbreviation of "patoc", meaning "rotten" or "soggy".

On October 9, 1963, 260 million cubic metres of rock slid down the side of Mount Toc and plunged into the reservoir created by the Vajont Dam, causing a megatsunami 250 metres high over the dam wall and destroying the town of Longarone and its suburbs.  1,918 people were killed, 1,450 of whom were in Longarone.

References

External links
 Excerpt from: Silenced Rivers: The Ecology and Politics of Large Dams by Patrick McCully 

Mountains of Veneto
Mountains of Friuli-Venezia Giulia
Mountains of the Alps